Baku Funicular is a funicular system in Baku, Azerbaijan. It connects a square on Neftchilar Avenue and Martyrs' Lane. It is the first and remains the only funicular system in the country.

Technical characteristics

 Length of railway track is 
 It consists of a single-track part and a passing place.
 There are two stations; electric and rope drive.
 Two coaches – BF-1 and BF-2 are exploited.
 Its transportation capacity is 2000 per day.
 Interval between departures of coaches is 10 minutes.
 Time of train service between stations is 4 minutes.
 Working time is from 10:00 to 22:00.

 Capacity of a coach is 28 people.

History

The funicular was constructed at initiative of Alish Lambaranski. It was opened in 1960. Tofig Ismayilov has been the director of the funicular since 2006. Funicular has 11 Personnel. In Soviet times, it used coaches made in Kharkiv.

Modern funicular
Baku Funicular was repaired several times. It was closed in late 1980s and reopened in 2001. Baku Funicular was capitally repaired in 2001 and 2007. In April 2011, it was again closed for the complete overhaul, and reopened on May 23, 2012. Architect: europroject, Vienna/Austria (Architects A.Mueller/W.Hoffelner/H.Peter). Constructor: GIG projects, Austria

The funicular has two stations called “Bahram Gur” and “Martyrs’ Lane".

References

Funicular railways in Azerbaijan
Transport in Baku
Passenger rail transport in Azerbaijan